The United States Department of Energy's Global Energy Storage Database (GESDB) is a free-access database of energy storage projects and policies funded by the U.S. DOE, Office of Electricity, and Sandia National Labs.

In 2013, the database covered 409 projects; it aimed to cover all energy storage projects globally by 2014.  By 2020, it covered 1,686 projects, comprising 22 GigaWatt power of US grid storage capacity. Pumped-storage hydroelectricity is around 90% of the energy capacity. Storage facilities are 80% efficient.

See also 

 List of energy storage projects
 Energy storage
 Hydroelectricity
 Hydropower
United States Department of Energy

References

External links 

 U.S. Dept of Energy - Energy Storage Systems
 U.S. Dept of Energy - Energy Storage Systems Database

Dams
Energy storage
Pumped storage power stations